(Rough and Unreleased) Homemade Recordings is the first extended play by Penny Hill. It was released on 10 November 2010.

Track listing

References

2010 EPs